This page is a list of the football players who played for the Switzerland senior football team born outside Switzerland. So this list doesn't include players born in the country but of foreign descent.

Last update on 6 December 2022.

Players

Argentina 
 Néstor Subiat 1994–1996 (15) (5)

Austria 
Bernt Haas 1996–2005 (36) (3)

Bosnia and Herzegovina

SFR Yugoslavia 
 Eldin Jakupović 2008 (1) (0)

Cameroon 
 Breel Embolo 2015– (63) (13)
 François Moubandje 2014–2018 (21) (0)
 Yvon Mvogo 2018– (4) (0)
 Dimitri Oberlin 2018– (2) (0)

Canada 
 Alain Rochat 2005 (1) (0)

Cape Verde 
 Gelson Fernandes 2007–2018 (67) (2)

Colombia 
 Alessandro Frigerio 1932–1937 (10) (1)
 Johan Vonlanthen 2004–2010 (40) (7)

Democratic Republic of the Congo 
 Badile Lubamba 2000 (2) (0)
 Blaise Nkufo 2000–2010 (34) (7)

England 
 Scott Sutter 2010 (2) (0)

France 
 Norbert Eschmann 1956–1964 (15) (3)
 Jacques Fatton 1946–1955 (53) (29)
 Roberto Frigerio 1967 (1) (0)
 Christophe Ohrel 1991–1997 (56) (6)

Germany 
 Alfred Bickel 1936–1954 (71) (15)
 Hans-Peter Friedländer 1942–1952 (22) (12)
 Timm Klose 2011– (17) (0)
 Kurt Pichler 1923–1928 (5) (0)

Indonesia 
 Law Adam 1929 (1) (0)

Iran 
 Hossein Ali Khan-Sardar 1920 (1) (0)

Italy 
 Serge Trinchero 1974–1978 (20) (2)

Ivory Coast 
 Johan Djourou 2006–2018 (76) (2)

Kosovo 
 Almen Abdi 2008–2009 (6) (0)
 Valon Behrami 2005–2018 (83) (2)
 Albert Bunjaku 2009–2011 (6) (0)
 Beg Ferati 2011 (1) (0)
 Milaim Rama 2003–2004 (7) (0)
 Xherdan Shaqiri 2010– (112) (27)

Nigeria 
 Innocent Emeghara 2011–2013 (9) (0)

North Macedonia

SFR Yugoslavia 
 Blerim Džemaili 2006–2018 (69) (10)
 Admir Mehmedi 2011–2021 (76) (10)

Portugal 

 Ulisses Garcia 2021– (4) (0)

Romania 
 Ernst Lörtscher 1934–1938 (21) (0)

Russia 
 Eugen Walaschek 1937–1945 (26) (4)

Spain 
 Adolphe Mengotti 1924 (1) (0)

Uruguay 
 Matías Vitkieviez 2012 (1) (0)

By country of birth

Notes 

Lists of Switzerland international footballers
Switzerland
Switzerland
Immigration to Switzerland
Immigration to Switzerland from the former Yugoslavia
Association football player non-biographical articles